A Master of Djinn is the award-winning 2021 fantasy steampunk novel by American writer P. Djèlí Clark, published by Tordotcom. The book is part of Clark's the Dead Djinn Universe and follows the events of the novelette "A Dead Djinn in Cairo", and the novella The Haunting of Tram Car 015. A Master of Djinn is the winner of the 2022 Nebula Award for Best Novel, the 2022 Locus Award for Best First Novel, and the 2022 Compton Crook Award for Best Novel, and was nominated for the 2022 Mythopoeic Award for Fantasy Literature, the 2022 World Fantasy Award for Best Novel, and the 2022 Hugo Award for Best Novel.

Plot 
In 1912 Cairo, Fatma el-Sha'arawi is an agent of the Ministry of Alchemy, Enchantments and Supernatural Entities, recently noted for having saved the world from a nefarious plot (see the events of the novelette, “A Dead Djinn in Cairo”, which take place prior to the novel). When the members of the Hermetic Brotherhood of Al-Jahiz, a group of primarily English men with enthusiasm for al-Jahiz, a Sudanese mystic who returned magic to the world about forty years prior, are brutally murdered by a man in a golden mask at one of their meetings, it is up to Fatma to track down the killer and solve the case. Assisted by her new partner at the Ministry, Hadia Abdel Hafez, and her lover, Siti, a devotee of Sekhmet and source of information from the underground worshipers of the Egyptian pantheon, Fatma tracks clues and leads across Cairo and the surrounding area in the wake of the gold-masked perpetrator, who claims to be al-Jahiz himself, returned to the world.

Reception 
Publishers Weekly gave the novel a starred review, calling it "stunning" and a "fantastic feat of postcolonial imagination", lauding Clark's "colorful prose," "thorough worldbuilding," and "keen, critical eye toward gender, class, and imperialism."

Kristi Chadwick at Library Journal gave the novel a starred review, calling it "a richly detailed, action-packed novel" and praising Clark's "fantastical worldbuilding [that] highlights thematic issues of colonialism, spirituality, and race relations" as well as "issues of gender and class".

Booklist gave the book a starred review, and described it as a "delightful combination of mystery, fantasy, and romance."

Marisa Mercurio of Strange Horizons called the novel "smart", "enormously fun", "an adventure that grapples with a history of imperialism", and praised Clark's rendering of a diverse cast of women from a variety of backgrounds.

Awards and nominations 
A Master of Djinn won the Nebula Award for Best Novel of 2021, the 2022 Locus Award for Best First Novel, and the 2022 Compton Crook Award for Best Novel. The novel was also nominated for the 2022 Mythopoeic Award for Fantasy Literature, the 2022 World Fantasy Award for Best Novel, and the 2022 Hugo Award for Best Novel.

References 

Speculative fiction
Dark fantasy
Historical fantasy novels
Alternate history novels
American steampunk novels
2021 fantasy novels
Nebula Award for Best Novel-winning works
LGBT novels